Natural gas and petroleum are exported from Turkmenistan by means of a number of existing or proposed pipelines.

Natural gas pipelines 
Central Asia–Center gas pipeline system
Central Asia–China gas pipeline
Dauletabad–Sarakhs–Khangiran pipeline
East–West pipeline
Korpeje–Kordkuy pipeline
Trans-Afghanistan Pipeline
Trans-Caspian Gas Pipeline

Oil pipeline 
Afghanistan Oil Pipeline

See also 

Transport in Turkmenistan

References